Probal Chowdhury (1947–2009) was a Bangladeshi freedom fighter, playback singer and composer. He rendered several songs from Swadhin Bangla Betar Kendra during the Bangladesh Liberation War. After the war, he pursued his solo career in playback.

Early life 
Probal Chowdhury was born in 1947 in Chittagong district, Bengal Presidency, British India (now Bangladesh). He was the sixth of Manmohan and Lilabati Chowdhury's ten children.

Career
He made his radio debut in 1966. In 1971, during the Bangladesh Liberation War, the family evacuated to Calcutta, India. There he, his elder sister Kalyani Ghosh, and younger sister Uma Khan joined Swadhin Bangla Betar Kendra, the radio station of the Bangladesh government in exile, as singers. In 2017, the government of Bangladesh recognized them as freedom fighters in acknowledgment of their contribution to the war effort.

After the war he continued to sing on albums, radio, Bangladesh Television, and in films. Among the songs he is remembered for are "Lokey jodi mondo koy sheto nohey porajoy", "Ami dhonyo hoyechhi ogo dhonyo tomari premer jonyo" in the film Sona Bou, and "Phuler bashor bhanglo jokhon" in the 1984 film Chandranath.

Chowdhury retired in 2004 from Bangladesh Chemical Industries Corporation in Chittagong, where he was an assistant manager. He died in Chittagong on 17 October 2009.

Notes

References 

People from Chittagong
20th-century Bangladeshi male singers
20th-century Bangladeshi singers
1947 births
2009 deaths
People of the Bangladesh Liberation War